Joseph Ray Townsell (born November 4, 1960) is a former National Football League (NFL) wide receiver.  He played for the New York Jets from 1985-1990. Previously, he played with the USFL's Los Angeles Express.

References

1960 births
Living people
Sportspeople from Reno, Nevada
American football wide receivers
American football return specialists
New York Jets players
Los Angeles Express players
UCLA Bruins football players